The Stiftskirche (Collegiate Church) is an inner-city church in Stuttgart, the capital of Baden-Württemberg, Germany. It is the main church of the Evangelical-Lutheran Church in Württemberg (Evangelische Landeskirche in Württemberg) as well as the parish church of the evangelical (Lutheran) inner-city church district of Stuttgart.

History and structure
Recent research found structures of a small Romanesque church dating to the 10th and 11th centuries within the outline of today's church.

In 1240, a stately three-naved church with two towers was built in the Romanic style, apparently by the Counts of Württemberg who from around that time were residing in the nearby Old Castle.  The remains of Ulrich I, Count of Württemberg and his second wife, Countess of Württemberg, Agnes von Schlesien-Liegnitz (both died in 1265) rest in a double tomb in the south tower chapel that dates to the late 13th century.

When Stuttgart became the new residence of the rulers of Württemberg, they added a new Gothic chancel between 1321 to 1347.  Ulrich V added a Late Gothic nave in the second half of the 15th century.

In 1500, a coloured, later (from the 19th century) golden pulpit was added.

With the adoption of the Lutheran Protestant Reformation in Württemberg in 1534, all pictures and altars were removed from the naves, pewage and a gallery were added. The tombstones were moved to the interior of the church.

The Lutheran reformer Johannes Brenz, the main Protestant Reformer of Württemberg, was buried under the chancel after his death in 1570.

From 1574, small statues of all the Counts of Württemberg (i.e. since Ulrich I) were added at the North wall of the chancel.

In 1608, a new grave crypt or burial vault was added. All of the Württemberg rulers until 1677 were buried there. Catherine Pavlovna of Russia, Queen of Württemberg from 1816 until 1819, was buried here from 1819 to 1824, before her remains were brought to a mausoleum on the Württemberg mountain.

In 1826, the roof of the chancel was renovated, as was most of the interior of the church in the 1840s.

Near the end of World War II, the church was heavily damaged by the bombing raids on Stuttgart in 1944.  The church was rebuilt in the 1950s, however, the interior was rebuilt in a modern style.

Gallery

Other burials
Eberhard I, Count of Württemberg
Elisabeth of Brandenburg, Duchess of Württemberg
Frederick I, Duke of Württemberg
Sibylla of Anhalt
John Frederick, Duke of Württemberg
Barbara Sophie of Brandenburg
Eberhard III, Duke of Württemberg
Duchess Anne Catherine of Salm
Maria Dorothea Sophia of Oettingen-Oettingen
William Louis, Duke of Württemberg
Magdalena Sibylla of Hesse-Darmstadt

Renovation 
The latest major renovation took place from 1999 to 2003. The design and realization of the new concept comes from the Hamburg-based Architect Bernhard Hirche. The altar sculpture was created by the Sculptor Holger Walter.

References

External links

Official Website

Churches in Stuttgart
Stuttgart Stiftskirche
Lutheran cathedrals in Germany
Stuttgart Stiftskirche
Stuttgart Stiftskirche
Burial sites of the House of Württemberg